Brizard is a surname. Notable people with the surname include:

 Antoine Brizard (b. 1944), French professional volleyball player
 Gabriel Brizard (ca. 1744–1793), French writer
 Jean-Claude Brizard (born 1962), Haitian-born American education professional
 Marie Brizard et Roger International, French alcoholic beverage company founded in 1755
 Marie Brizard Wine & Spirits, French wine and spirits producer and distributor founded in 1991
 Philippe Brizard (1933-2021), French actor
 Pierre Brizard (1737–1804), French furniture designer

French-language surnames